Cyril Godfrey Baseley (2 October 1904 – 2 February 1997), credited as Godfrey Basely, was a BBC radio executive famous for being the creator of the soap opera, The Archers.

Early life
Cyril Godfrey Baseley was born at The Square, Alvechurch in Worcestershire, England, son of master butcher Walter Ernest Baseley and Mary Ellen, née Court. He was educated at Bootham School, York.

Before creating The Archers, he had previous experience in refashioning radio programmes about farming, mainly for the Midland region.

The Archers
Inspiration came from another radio programme at the time: Dick Barton - Special Agent  he decided to create a farming show with a narrative. The idea came from a suggestion made to him by Henry Burtt of Dowsby Hall near Rippingale, a farmer he had interviewed in Lincolnshire. Baseley seems to have modelled Dan and Phil Archer on Burtt and his son Stephen.  

Baseley had tried to write the story but later threw one away. This was saved by his secretary but he threw it away again and engaged two of the  Dick Barton writers: Ted Mason and Geoffrey Webb. After telling him some detail of the characters, Mason and Webb wrote the first Archers script.

The pilot programme was broadcast to the English Midlands on Whit Monday, 1950, and was broadcast across the UK on the BBC Home Service on 1 January 1951.

In the late 1960s Baseley took a part in The Archers playing the part of Brigadier Winstanley, although billed in the Radio Times under a pseudonym.
Baseley was replaced as script editor for The Archers in 1972.   His successor, Malcolm Lynch, had previously worked as a script writer for the television drama series, Coronation Street.   Baseley was critical of some of his successors.   

Godfrey Baseley died at Bromsgrove on 2 February 1997, aged 92

References

External links
uk.media.radio.archers History of The Archers

British radio people
The Archers
1904 births
1997 deaths
People educated at Bootham School